Soyuz 24 (Union 24) was a February, 1977, Soviet mission to the Salyut 5 space station, the third and final mission to the station, the last purely military crew for the Soviets and the final mission to a military Salyut. The cosmonauts Viktor Gorbatko and Yuri Glazkov re-activated the station after toxic fumes had apparently terminated the mission of Soyuz 21, the previous crew.

They performed biological and materials experiments while on board. Other presumed activities included photographic reconnaissance, and finishing tasks the previous crew was forced to abandon when their mission abruptly ended. The Soyuz 24 crew landed after spending 18 days in space, and the Salyut station was de-orbited six months later.

Crew

Backup crew

Reserve crew

Mission highlights 
The cosmonauts Gorbatko and Glazkov were the back-up crew for Soyuz 23, which failed to dock with Salyut 5 several months earlier. Soyuz 24 was launched 7 February 1977, and successfully docked with the orbiting space station the next day. However, the crew did not immediately enter the station, atypically having a sleep period first and delaying their entry by some 11 hours. Observers speculate that problems with fumes which may have caused the Soyuz 21 crew to leave were resolved or dealt with by the new crew. They entered the station wearing breathing apparatus and made numerous tests of the atmosphere before apparently concluding conditions were safe and removing their breathing devices.

Observers speculate that the flight had a specific objective and was not meant to be a long-duration mission. In any case, fuel for the station to maneuver was too depleted to attempt a long mission. The crew continued the research started by the Soyuz 21 crew, performed Earth resources work, biological and materials experiments. But, being a part of the Almaz military Salyut program, other unrevealed projects were likely carried out. The flight would prove to be not only the final flight to a military Salyut station, but also the final all-military crew to be launched by the Soviets. On 21 February 1977, the crew performed an air-changing experiment, shown on TV, slowly venting air from one end of the station to the other while releasing 100 kg of air from tanks in the docked Soyuz orbital module. This was a test of the future air replenishment techniques to be carried out with Progress transports in subsequent space stations.

They began to activate the Soyuz 24 on 23 February 1977, then deactivate the space station, and undocked and landed near Arkalyk on 25 February 1977. The Soyuz landed in a blowing snowstorm and recovery crews could not locate the space capsule. As it turned out, the search and rescue beacon was unable to deploy due to being jammed shut from snow, so Gorbatko had to free it by hand.

On 26 February 1977, Salyut 5 ejected a research module. The research module, which was recovered on Soviet territory, containing exposed film and experiments carried out by the two crews who crewed the space station. The Salyut 5 space station was deorbited on 8 August 1977.

Mission parameters 
 Mass:  
 Perigee:  
 Apogee: 
 Inclination: 51.60°
 Period: 89.20 minutes

References 

Crewed Soyuz missions
1977 in the Soviet Union
Spacecraft launched in 1977
Spacecraft launched by Soyuz-U rockets
Spacecraft which reentered in 1977